Tam Iran Khodro Tehran Futsal Club (Persian: باشگاه فوتسال تام ایران خودرو) was an Iranian futsal club based in Tehran.

Notable players 

  Mohammad Hashemzadeh
  Ebrahim Masoudi
  Babak Masoumi
  Reza Naseri
  Vahid Shamsaei
  Majid Tikdarinejad

Honours 
National:
 Futsal Super League
 Champions (2): 2004–05, 2007–08
 Runners-up (1): 2005–06
 Iran Futsal's 1st Division
 Champions (1): 2003–04

Individual
 Top Goalscorer:
  2005–06:  Vahid Shamsaei (55)

Season-by-season 
The table below chronicles the achievements of the Club in various competitions.

References

External links 

Futsal clubs in Iran
Sport in Tehran
Defunct futsal clubs in Iran
2009 disestablishments in Iran